Excursions is an American independent film directed by Daniel Martinico.  The film follows two couples who retreat to a remote cabin in the woods for mysterious purposes.  It was written by Martinico and Hugo Armstrong, who collaborated previously on the 2012 film OK, Good.

Release 
Excursions premiered in the Beyond program at the 2016 Slamdance Film Festival, and subsequently screened at the Chicago Underground Film Festival and New Orleans Film Festival, among others.  The film was presented by Slamdance Cinema Club and ArcLight Cinemas as part of the ArcLight Presents screening series in Hollywood and Chicago in July 2016.  It was named one of the 10 best undistributed films of 2016 by The Film Stage.

References

External links 
 
 

2016 films
American independent films
2010s English-language films
2010s American films